This is a list of places in the unitary authority of Merthyr Tydfil County Borough, Wales.

Towns
Merthyr Tydfil
Treharris

Communities
Local government communities:
 Bedlinog (with the only elected Community Council in the borough) 
 Cyfarthfa 
 Dowlais 
 Gurnos 
 Merthyr Vale 
 Pant 
 Park 
 Penydarren 
 Town 
 Treharris 
 Troed-y-rhiw
 Vaynor

Electoral wards

Bedlinog
Cyfarthfa
Dowlais
Gurnos
Merthyr Vale
Park
Penydarren
Plymouth
Town
Treharris
Vaynor

See also
 Lists of places in Wales

References

Merthyr Tydfil County
places